Leon Ong Chua (born June 28, 1936) is an American electrical engineer and computer scientist. He is a professor in the electrical engineering and computer sciences department at the University of California, Berkeley, which he joined in 1971. He has contributed to nonlinear circuit theory and cellular neural network theory.

He is the inventor and namesake of Chua's circuit one of the first and most widely known circuits to exhibit chaotic behavior, and was the first to conceive the theories behind, and postulate the existence of, the memristor. Thirty-seven years after he predicted its existence, a working solid-state memristor was created by a team led by R. Stanley Williams at Hewlett Packard.

Alongside Tamas Roska, Chua also introduced the first algorithmically programmable analog cellular neural network (CNN) processor in the world.

Early life and education
A first-generation Filipino-Chinese-American, Chua and his twin sister grew up as members of the Hokkien Chinese ethnic minority in the Philippines under the reign of the Empire of Japan during World War II. Of Hoklo ancestry, his parents immigrated from Jinjiang, Southern Fujian province. In 1959, he earned his BSEE degree from Mapúa Institute of Technology in Manila, Philippines. He briefly taught at Mapúa for a year, before emigrating to the United States on a scholarship to the Massachusetts Institute of Technology, where he earned an MSEE degree in 1961. He then earned a Ph.D from the University of Illinois, Urbana-Champaign in 1964. His PhD thesis was entitled Nonlinear Network Analysis—The Parametric Approach. Over the ensuing years, he has received eight honorary doctorates.

Chua has four daughters; the eldest, Amy Chua (a professor of law at Yale University), Katrin (a Professor of Medicine at Stanford University), and Cynthia (Cindy, a Special Olympics Gold medalist), and Michelle. In addition to his four daughters, Chua has seven grandchildren.

Career
Chua was a member of the faculty at Purdue University from 1964 to 1970 before joining Berkeley in 1971. His current research interests include cellular neural networks, nonlinear networks, nonlinear circuits and systems, nonlinear dynamics, bifurcation theory, and chaos theory. He was the editor of The International Journal of Bifurcation and Chaos until 2009, and is now the honorary editor.

Awards and honors
 Member of the Academy of Europe, http://www.ae-info.org/ae/User/Chua_Leon
Doctor Honoris Causa from the École Polytechnique Fédérale de Lausanne, Switzerland (1983) 
Honorary Doctorate from the University of Tokushima, Japan (1984) 
Honorary Doctorate from the Technische Universität Dresden, Germany (1992) 
Doctor Honoris Causa from the Technical University of Budapest, Hungary (1994) 
Doctor Honoris Causa from the University of Santiago de Compostela, Spain (1995) 
Doctor Honoris Causa from the Goethe University Frankfurt, Germany (1996) 
Doctor Honoris Causa from the Gheorghe Asachi Technical University of Iaşi, Romania (1997) 
Doctor Honoris Causa from the University of Catania, Italy (2000) 
Doctor Honoris Causa from the AGH University of Science and Technology, Poland (2003) 
Doctor Honoris Causa from the University of Le Havre, France (2009) 
Doctor Honoris Causa from the KU Leuven, Belgium (2013) 
Doctor of Science Honoris Causa from the Hong Kong Polytechnic University, Hong Kong (2014) 
Doctor Honoris Causa from the Polytechnic University of Turin, Italy (2015) 
 IEEE Browder J. Thompson Memorial Prize Award (1967) 
 IEEE Guillemin-Cauer Award (1972, 1985, 1989) 
 IEEE W.R.G. Baker Prize Paper Award (1973), for the paper  "Memristor: The Missing Circuit Element" in IEEE TRANSACTIONS on Circuit Theory, September 1971 
 IEEE Neural Networks Pioneer Award (2000) 
 IEEE Gustav Robert Kirchhoff Award (2005), For seminal contributions to the foundation of nonlinear circuit theory, and for inventing Chua's Circuit and Cellular Networks, each spawning a new research area. 
 M. E. Van Valkenburg Award (1995 and 1998)
 IEEE Circuits and Systems Society Vitold Belevitch Award (2007), For seminal contributions to nonlinear circuit theory, the first mathematically proven physical implementation of Chaos (Chua circuit), the local activity principle as the root of complexity, the cellular neural/nonlinear network principle and basic theory, and the qualitative theory of complexity in 1D cellular automata.
2010 Guggenheim Fellowship

References

External links
 

1936 births
Living people
American computer scientists
American electrical engineers
American people of Chinese descent
Chaos theorists
Fellow Members of the IEEE
Filipino emigrants to the United States
Filipino people of Chinese descent
Hokkien scientists
Mapúa University alumni
Members of Academia Europaea
MIT School of Engineering alumni
Purdue University faculty
Filipino twins
American twins
UC Berkeley College of Engineering faculty
University of Illinois Urbana-Champaign alumni
Electrical engineering academics